The 2003 Anaheim Angels season involved the Angels finishing 3rd in the American League West Division with a record of 77 wins and 85 losses.

Offseason
January 23, 2003: Adam Riggs was signed as a free agent with the Anaheim Angels.

Regular season
August 16, 2003: Adam Riggs played for the Angels in a home game against the Tigers on August 16. He would gain notoriety because of the jersey he wore in the game. Riggs wore a sleeveless jersey that read "A-N-G-E-E-S" across the front. Riggs did not realize the mistake until his teammates advised him in the dugout between innings.

Season standings

Record vs. opponents

Roster

Player stats

Batting

Starters by position
Note: Pos = Position; G = Games played; AB = At bats; H = Hits; Avg. = Batting average; HR = Home runs; RBI = Runs batted in

Other batters
Note: G = Games played; AB = At bats; H = Hits; Avg. = Batting average; HR = Home runs; RBI = Runs batted in

Pitching

Starting pitchers
Note: G = Games pitched; IP = Innings pitched; W = Wins; L = Losses; ERA = Earned run average; SO = Strikeouts

Other pitchers
Note: G = Games pitched; IP = Innings pitched; W = Wins; L = Losses; ERA = Earned run average; SO = Strikeouts

Relief pitchers
Note: G = Games pitched; W = Wins; L = Losses; SV = Saves; ERA = Earned run average; SO = Strikeouts

Farm system

References

2003 Anaheim Angels team page at Baseball Reference
2003 Anaheim Angels team page at www.baseball-almanac.com

Los Angeles Angels seasons
Los
Los